The 2017 Liga 3 Riau is the third edition of Liga 3 Riau as a qualifying round for the national round of 2017 Liga 3. Riau F.C. are the defending champions.

The competition scheduled starts on 17 August 2017.

Teams
There are 16 clubs which will participate the league in this season.

References 

2017 in Indonesian football
Riau